Jakub Plánička  (born 25 December 1984 in Ostrava) is a Czech football player who last played for the reserve team of ŠK Slovan Bratislava.

Notes

External links
 

1984 births
Living people
Sportspeople from Ostrava
Czech footballers
Czech expatriate footballers
Association football goalkeepers
Czech expatriate sportspeople in Slovakia
Expatriate footballers in Slovakia
SFC Opava players
1. HFK Olomouc players
FK Dukla Prague players
Slovak Super Liga players
2. Liga (Slovakia) players
3. Liga (Slovakia) players
MŠK Púchov players
1. FC Tatran Prešov players
FK Rača players
ŠK Slovan Bratislava players